Prionapteryx bergii is a moth in the family Crambidae. It was described by Zeller in 1877. It is found in Argentina.

References

Ancylolomiini
Moths described in 1877